Super Air Zonk: Rockabilly-Paradise, released in Japan as , is a horizontal scrolling shooter developed by Dual and published by Hudson Soft. It was released for the TurboGrafx-CD/TurboDuo in 1993, and was released on the Wii's Virtual Console on November 19, 2007 in North America, and on January 29, 2008 in Japan.

Super Air Zonk is the sequel to the 1992 game Air Zonk, both of which are part of the Bonk series of games. As a sequel, Super Air Zonk contains all-new levels, assistants, and enemies, as well as a Red Book CD audio soundtrack consisting of rockabilly music. While the original Air Zonk relied heavily on multilayer parallax scrolling, Super Air Zonk features mostly single-plane backgrounds with a few exceptions.

Reception
 
Electronic Gaming Monthly gave the game a 5 out of 10, commenting that the game has very little action or intensity and is too easy by far. GamePro also found the game to be too easy, but praised the controls, the animation, and the soundtrack, and noted that with only a slow trickle of games coming out for the Duo, owners of the console had little choice but to buy the game.

References

External links

1993 video games
Horizontally scrolling shooters
TurboGrafx-CD games
Virtual Console games
Video games developed in Japan
Hudson Soft games
Video game sequels
Video game spin-offs
Single-player video games